Ischyrus dunedinensis, the three-spotted pleasing fungus beetle, is a species of pleasing fungus beetle in the family Erotylidae. It is found in North America.

References

Further reading

 
 
 
 
 
 
 

Erotylidae
Beetles described in 1917